Active Learning in Higher Education is a peer-reviewed academic journal that publishes papers three times a year in the field of Education. The journal's editor is Virginia Clinton-Lisell (University of North Dakota). It has been in publication since 2000 and is currently published by SAGE Publications in association with Institute for Learning and Teaching in Higher Education. Its Scopus CiteScore is 5.40 and its 2 year impact factor is 4.765.

Scope 

Active Learning in Higher Education is aimed at all those who teach and support learning in higher education and those who undertake or use research into effective learning, teaching and assessment in universities and colleges. The journal aims to focus on all aspects of development, innovations and good practice in higher education teaching and learning, including the use of information and communication technologies and issues concerning the management of teaching and learning.

Abstracting and indexing 
Active Learning in Higher Education is abstracted and indexed in the following databases:
 Academic Premier
Current Contents: Social and Behavioral Sciences
 Educational Administration Abstracts
 Educational Research Abstracts Online
 SCOPUS
Social Sciences Citation Index

References

External links 
 

SAGE Publishing academic journals
English-language journals
Education journals
Publications established in 2000
Triannual journals